Move It On Over is the second album by George Thorogood and the Destroyers, released by Rounder Records in 1978. The album contains all cover material. Its title track, Hank Williams' "Move It On Over", received major FM radio airplay when released, as did the Bo Diddley cover, "Who Do You Love?"

Track listing
 "Move It On Over" (Hank Williams) – 4:19
 "Who Do You Love?" (Bo Diddley) – 4:17
 "The Sky Is Crying" (Elmore James) – 5:09
 "Cocaine Blues" (T.J. Arnall) – 2:48
 "It Wasn't Me" (Chuck Berry) – 3:54
 "That Same Thing" (Willie Dixon) – 3:05
 "So Much Trouble" (Brownie McGhee) – 3:15
 "I'm Just Your Good Thing" (James Moore) – 3:29
 "Baby Please Set a Date" (Homesick James Williamson) – 4:42
 "New Hawaiian Boogie" (E. James) – 4:34

Personnel

Musicians
George Thorogood – guitar, vocals
Billy Blough – bass
Jeff Simon – drums, vocals 
Uncle Meat Pennington – tambourine and maracas

Technical
Ken Irwin – producer
John Nagy – engineer
Susan Marsh – design
David Gahr – photography (front cover)

Charts

Certifications and sales

References

1978 albums
George Thorogood and the Destroyers albums
Rounder Records albums